Edward Morley Callaghan  (February 22, 1903 – August 25, 1990) was a Canadian novelist, short story writer, playwright, and TV and radio personality.

Biography

Of Canadian/English-immigrant parentage, Callaghan was born and raised in Toronto, Ontario. He was educated at Withrow PS, Riverdale Collegiate Institute, the University of Toronto and Osgoode Hall Law School. He articled and was called to the Bar, but did not practice law. During the 1920s he worked at the Toronto Star where he became friends with a fellow reporter Ernest Hemingway, formerly of The Kansas City Star. Callaghan began writing stories that were well received and soon were recognized as one of the best short story writers of the day. In 1929 he spent some months in Paris, where he was part of the great gathering of writers in Montparnasse that included Ernest Hemingway, Ezra Pound, Gertrude Stein, F. Scott Fitzgerald, and James Joyce.

Callaghan's novels and short stories are marked by undertones of Roman Catholicism, often focusing on individuals whose essential characteristic is a strong but often weakened sense of self. His first novel was Strange Fugitive (1928); several short stories, novellas, and novels followed. Callaghan published little between 1937 and 1950 - an artistically dry period. However, during these years, many non-fiction articles were written in various periodicals such as New World (Toronto), and National Home Monthly. Luke Baldwin's Vow, a slim novel about a boy and his dog, was originally published in a 1947 edition of Saturday Evening Post and soon became a juvenile classic read in school rooms around the world. The Loved and the Lost (1951) won the Governor General's Award. Callaghan's later works include, among others, The Many Colored Coat (1960), A Passion in Rome (1961), A Fine and Private Place (1975), A Time for Judas (1983), Our Lady of the Snows (1985). His last novel was A Wild Old Man Down the Road (1988). Publications of short stories have appeared in The Lost and Found Stories of Morley Callaghan (1985) and in The New Yorker Stories (2001). The four-volume The Complete Stories (2003) collects for the first time 90 of his stories.

Callaghan was also a contributor to The New Yorker, Harper's Bazaar, Maclean's, Esquire, Cosmopolitan, Saturday Evening Post, Yale Review, New World, Performing Arts in Canada, and Twentieth Century Literature.

Callaghan married Loretto Dee, with whom he had two sons: Michael (born November 1931) and Barry (born 1937), a poet and author in his own right. Barry Callaghan's memoir Barrelhouse Kings (1998), examines his career and that of his father. After outliving most of his contemporaries, Callaghan died after a brief illness in Toronto at the age of 87. He was interred in Mount Hope Catholic Cemetery in Ontario.

Recognition

Callaghan was awarded the Royal Society of Canada's Lorne Pierce Medal in 1960. In 1982 he was made a Companion of the Order of Canada.

Morley Callaghan is the subject of a CBC Television Life and Times episode, and the CBC mini-series, Hemingway Vs. Callaghan, which first aired in March 2003.

From 1951 until he died in 1990, the author had lived in the Rosedale, Toronto area, at 20 Dale Avenue. A historic plaque at the nearby Glen Road footbridge summarizes Callaghan's noteworthy writing career and the most significant of his literary contemporaries, including Ernest Hemingway and F Scott Fitzgerald.

Commemorative postage stamp
On September 8, 2003, to commemorate the 50th anniversary of the National Library of Canada, Canada Post released a special commemorative series, "The Writers of Canada", with a design by Katalina Kovats, featuring two English-Canadian and two French-Canadian stamps. Three million stamps were issued. Callaghan was chosen for one of the English-Canadian stamps.

Bibliography

Novels
 Strange Fugitive - 1928
 It's Never Over - 1930
 A Broken Journey - 1932
 Such Is My Beloved - 1934
 They Shall Inherit the Earth - 1935
 More Joy in Heaven - 1937
 The Loved and the Lost - 1951
 The Many Colored Coat - 1960 (reissued as The Man with the Coat, 1988)
 A Passion in Rome - 1961
 A Fine and Private Place - 1975
 A Time for Judas - 1983
 Our Lady of the Snows - 1985 (based on his novella The Enchanted Pimp)
 A Wild Old Man on the Road - 1988

Novellas
 No Man's Meat - 1931
 Luke Baldwin's Vow - 1948 (reissued as The Vow, 2006)
 The Varsity Story - 1948
 An Autumn Penitent - 1973 (and In His Own Country)
 Close to the Sun Again - 1977
 No Man's Meat and The Enchanted Pimp - 1978

Short fiction
 A Native Argosy - 1929
 Now That April's Here and Other Stories - 1936
 Morley Callaghan's Stories - 1959
 Stories - 1967
 The Lost and Found Stories of Morley Callaghan - 1985
 The Morley Callaghan Reader - 1997
 The New Yorker Stories - 2001
 The Complete Stories (four volumes) - 2003
 Ancient Lineage and Other Stories - 2012
 The Snob
 The Sentimentalists

Non-fiction
 That Summer in Paris: Memories of Tangled Friendships with Hemingway, Fitzgerald and Some Others - 1963
 Winter - 1974

Plays
 Turn Again Home (based on the novel They Shall Inherit the Earth, produced in New York City in 1940, and produced under the title Going Home in Toronto in 1950)
 Just Ask George (produced in Toronto, 1940)
 To Tell the Truth (produced in Toronto, 1949)
 Season of the Witch - 1976

Film adaptations
Now That April's Here (1958)
The Cap (1984)

Further reading

Books
 Boire, Gary A., Morley Callaghan and His Works - 1990
 Boire, Gary A., Morley Callaghan: Literary Anarchist - 1994
 Cameron, Donald, Conversations with Canadian Novelists, Part Two - 1973
 Contemporary Literary Criticism, Volume 3 - 1975
 Contemporary Literary Criticism, Volume 14 - 1980
 Contemporary Literary Criticism,  Volume 41 - 1987
 Contemporary Literary Criticism, Volume 65 - 1991
 Dictionary of Literary Biography, Volume 68: Canadian Writers, 1920–1959, First Series - 1988
 Morley, Patricia, Morley Callaghan - 1978
 Orange, John, Orpheus in Winter: Morley Callaghan's The Loved and the Lost - 1993
 Sutherland, Fraser, The Style of Innocence - 1972
 Wilson, Edmund, O Canada - 1965
 Woodcock, George, Moral Predicament: Morley Callaghan's More Joy in Heaven - 1993

Periodicals
 Books in Canada, April, 1986, pp. 32–33.
 Canadian Forum, March, 1960; February, 1968.
 Canadian Literature, summer, 1964
 Canadian Literature, winter, 1984, pp. 66–69.
 Canadian Literature, autumn, 1990, pp. 148–49.
 Dalhousie Review,  autumn, 1959.
 Essays on Canadian Writing, winter, 1984–85, pp. 309– 15
 Essays on Canadian Writing, summer, 1990, pp. 16–20.
 Form and Century,  April, 1934.
 New Republic, February 9, 1963.
 New Yorker, November 26, 1960.
 Queen's Quarterly, autumn, 1957
 Queen's Quarterly, autumn, 1989, pp. 717–19.
 Saturday Night, October, 1983, pp. 73–74.
 Tamarack Review, winter, 1962.
 American Spectator, February, 1991.

References

External links
 Morley Callaghan archives held at Library and Archives Canada, Ottawa, Ontario

1903 births
1990 deaths
20th-century Canadian dramatists and playwrights
Canadian male novelists
Canadian Roman Catholics
Canadian male short story writers
Companions of the Order of Canada
Fellows of the Royal Society of Canada
Governor General's Award-winning fiction writers
Members of the Order of Ontario
Canadian people of Irish descent
Lawyers in Ontario
Writers from Toronto
University of Toronto alumni
Toronto Star people
20th-century Canadian novelists
Canadian male dramatists and playwrights
20th-century Canadian short story writers
Osgoode Hall Law School alumni
20th-century Canadian male writers